Skjånes is a small village in Gamvik Municipality in Troms og Finnmark county, Norway. The village is located on the shores of the Hopsfjorden, an arm that branches off the main Tanafjorden. The 60-70 residents work mostly in the fishing industry. Hop Church is located in this village, serving the southern part of the municipality.

Images

References

External links 

Villages in Finnmark
Gamvik
Populated places of Arctic Norway